Lincoln Ellsworth (May 12, 1880 – May 26, 1951) was a polar explorer from the United States and a major benefactor of the American Museum of Natural History.

Biography
Lincoln Ellsworth was born on May 12, 1880, to James Ellsworth and Eva Frances Butler in Chicago, Illinois. He also lived in Hudson, Ohio, as a child. He attended The Hill School and took two years longer than usual to graduate, before entering the Sheffield Scientific School at Yale University. His academic performance was poor, and he subsequently enrolled at Columbia University and McGill before ending his academic career.

Lincoln Ellsworth's father, James, a wealthy coal man from the United States, spent US$100,000 to fund Roald Amundsen's 1925 attempt to fly from Svalbard to the North Pole. Amundsen, accompanied by Lincoln Ellsworth, pilot Hjalmar Riiser-Larsen, flight mechanic Karl Feucht and two other team members, set out in two Dornier Wal flying boats, the N24 and N25, in an attempted to reach the North Pole on May 21. When one airplane lost power, both made forced landings and, as a result, became separated. It took 3 days for the crews to regroup and 7 take off attempts before they were able to return N25 to the air 28 days later. Ellsworth senior died in Italy on June 2, 1925, while waiting for news of his lost son.

In early March 1926, under the headline "Across the Pole by Dirigible," the New York Times announced the Amundsen-Ellsworth Expedition.
A long article in the same edition (by Fitzhugh Green, one of Byrd's navy colleagues) was headed "Massed Attack On Polar Region Begins Soon." Ellsworth accompanied Amundsen on his second effort to fly over the Pole in the airship Norge, designed and piloted by the Italian engineer Umberto Nobile, in a flight from Svalbard to Alaska. On May 12, the Geographic North Pole was sighted.

Ellsworth made four expeditions to Antarctica between 1933 and 1939 using as his aircraft transporter and base, a former Norwegian herring boat that he named Wyatt Earp after his hero.  The aircraft, named Polar Star, was a Northrop Gamma outfitted with skis.

On November 23, 1935, Ellsworth discovered the Ellsworth Mountains of Antarctica when he made a trans-Antarctic flight from Dundee Island to the Ross Ice Shelf. He gave the descriptive name Sentinel Range, which was later named for the northern half of the Ellsworth Mountains. During the flight, his aircraft ran out of fuel, forcing a landing near the Little America camp established by Richard Byrd. Because of a faulty radio, he and his pilot, Herbert Hollick-Kenyon, were unable to notify authorities about the landing. The two men were declared missing, and the British research ship Discovery steamed out from Melbourne, Australia to search for them. The two men were discovered January 16, 1936, after almost two months alone at Little America. They returned to New York City on April 6, and their support ship, the MS Wyatt Earp, arrived separately two weeks later.

Ellsworth Land, Mount Ellsworth, and Lake Ellsworth, all in Antarctica, are all named for Lincoln Ellsworth.

Honors
In 1927, the Boy Scouts of America made Lincoln Ellsworth an Honorary Scout, a new category of Scout created that same year. This distinction was given to "American citizens whose achievements in outdoor activity, exploration, and worthwhile adventure are of such an exceptional character as to capture the imagination of boys...". The other eighteen men who were awarded this distinction were: Roy Chapman Andrews; Robert Bartlett; Frederick Russell Burnham; Richard E. Byrd; George Kruck Cherrie; James L. Clark; Merian C. Cooper; Louis Agassiz Fuertes; George Bird Grinnell; Charles A. Lindbergh; Donald Baxter MacMillan; Clifford H. Pope; George Palmer Putnam; Kermit Roosevelt; Carl Rungius; Stewart Edward White; Orville Wright. The Boy Scout's Book of True Adventure, Fourteen Honorary Scouts, includes an essay "The First Crossing of the Polar Sea" by Lincoln Ellsworth. The United States Postal Service once produced a stamp with his picture. To this day, the high school athletic teams in Hudson, Ohio, are nicknamed "The Explorers" after Ellsworth.

In 1928, Ellsworth was awarded a Congressional Gold Medal that honored both his 1925 and 1926 polar flights. Eight years later in 1936 he was awarded a second medal, for "his claims on behalf of the United States of approximately 350,000 square miles in Antarctica and for his 2,500-mile aerial survey of the heart of
Antarctica." He thus became one of only four people to be awarded two Congressional Gold Medals. The former Antarctic base Ellsworth Station was named after him. In 1937 he was awarded the Patron's Medal of the Royal Geographical Society for his improvements in the technique of polar aerial navigation.

The Hall of Lincoln Ellsworth at the American Museum of Natural History is dedicated to his Arctic and Antarctic voyages.

See also
 Airship Norge
 North Pole
 List of people on stamps of the United States – Scott catalogue 2389, 25c stamp

References

External links 

 
 
 
 
 The Papers of Lincoln Ellsworth at Dartmouth College Library

1880 births
1951 deaths
American Polar Society honorary members
Congressional Gold Medal recipients
Explorers of Antarctica
People associated with the American Museum of Natural History
People from Chicago
People from Hudson, Ohio
The Hill School alumni
Western Reserve Academy alumni